Séamus Roche (born 8 September 1969) is an Irish retired hurling referee. He is a former Gaelic footballer and hurler with his club Kilsheelan–Kilcash.

Roche was the referee for the 2005 All-Ireland Senior Hurling Championship Final between Cork and Galway and was a linesman for the 2003 and 2004 finals.		
	
He retired from inter-county refereeing in 2011.

References

External links
Hurling Stats Profile

1969 births
Living people
Dual players
Gaelic football managers
Hurling referees
Kilsheelan-Kilcash Gaelic footballers
Kilsheelan-Kilcash hurlers
Tipperary inter-county Gaelic footballers